The 90th Brigade was a formation of  the British Army. It was raised as part of the new army, also known as Kitchener's Army, and assigned to the 30th Division. It served on the Western Front and in the Italian Campaign during the First World War.

Order of battle
The composition  of the brigade was:
16th (Service) Battalion, Manchester Regiment (1st City) (left June 1918)
17th (Service) Battalion, Manchester Regiment (2nd City) (left February 1918)
18th (Service) Battalion, Manchester Regiment (3rd City) (disbanded February 1918)
19th (Service) Battalion, Manchester Regiment (4th City) (left December 1915)
2nd Battalion, Royal Scots Fusiliers (joined December 1915, left April 1918)
2nd Battalion, Bedfordshire Regiment (joined from 89th Brigade February 1918, left May 1918)
14th (Service) Battalion, Argyll & Sutherland Highlanders (joined April 1918, left June 1918)
90th Machine Gun Company (joined 13 March 1916, moved to 30th Battalion M.G.C. 1 March 1918)
90th Trench Mortar Battery (formed by 16 June 1916)

On reorganisation in July 1918:

2/14th (County of London) Battalion, London Regiment
2/15th (County of London) Battalion, London Regiment
2/16th (County of London) Battalion, London Regiment
90th Trench Mortar Battery

References

Infantry brigades of the British Army in World War I
Pals Brigades of the British Army